Sonamura is a town and a Nagar Panchayat in the Indian state of Tripura. It is the headquarter of  Sonamura Subdivision in Sipahijala district and lies on the border with Bangladesh to the east of Comilla.

Demographics
As of the 2011 India census, Sonamura had a population of 10,074. Males constituted 51% of the population and females 49%. Sonamura has an average literacy rate of 73%, higher than the national average of 59.5%: male literacy is 77%, and female literacy is 68%. In Sonamura, 11% of the population is under 6 years of age.

Politics
Sonamura’s assembly constituency is part of Tripura West (Lok Sabha constituency).

See also
 List of cities and towns in Tripura

References

Cities and towns in Sipahijala district